Elections to Castlereagh Borough Council were held on 5 May 2005 on the same day as the other Northern Irish local government elections. The election used four district electoral areas to elect a total of 23 councillors.

Election results

Note: "Votes" are the first preference votes.

Districts summary

|- class="unsortable" align="centre"
!rowspan=2 align="left"|Ward
! % 
!Cllrs
! % 
!Cllrs
! %
!Cllrs
! %
!Cllrs
! % 
!Cllrs
!rowspan=2|TotalCllrs
|- class="unsortable" align="center"
!colspan=2 bgcolor="" | DUP
!colspan=2 bgcolor="" | UUP
!colspan=2 bgcolor="" | Alliance
!colspan=2 bgcolor="" | SDLP
!colspan=2 bgcolor="white"| Others
|-
|align="left"|Castlereagh Central
|bgcolor="#D46A4C"|54.4
|bgcolor="#D46A4C"|4
|12.5
|1
|16.3
|1
|6.5
|0
|10.3
|0
|6
|-
|align="left"|Castlereagh East
|bgcolor="#D46A4C"|59.2
|bgcolor="#D46A4C"|5
|18.9
|1
|12.4
|1
|0.0
|0
|9.5
|0
|7
|-
|align="left"|Castlereagh South
|bgcolor="#D46A4C"|36.7
|bgcolor="#D46A4C"|2
|18.3
|1
|17.1
|1
|22.2
|0
|5.7
|0
|5
|-
|align="left"|Castlereagh West
|bgcolor="#D46A4C"|34.1
|bgcolor="#D46A4C"|2
|20.6
|1
|19.9
|1
|20.9
|1
|4.5
|0
|5
|- class="unsortable" class="sortbottom" style="background:#C9C9C9"
|align="left"| Total
|46.5
|13
|17.8
|4
|16.2
|4
|12.0
|2
|7.5
|0
|23
|-
|}

Districts results

Castlereagh Central

2001: 3 x DUP, 1 x Alliance, 1 x UUP, 1 x PUP
2005: 4 x DUP, 1 x Alliance, 1 x UUP
2001-2005 Change: DUP gain from PUP

Castlereagh East

2001: 4 x DUP, 1 x UUP, 1 x Alliance, 1 x Independent
2005: 5 x DUP, 1 x UUP, 1 x Alliance
2001-2005 Change: DUP gain from Independent

Castlereagh South

2001: 2 x UUP, 1 x DUP, 1 x SDLP, 1 x Alliance
2005: 2 x DUP, 1 x UUP, 1 x SDLP, 1 x Alliance
2001-2005 Change: DUP gain from UUP

Castlereagh West

2001: 2 x DUP, 1 x Alliance, 1 x SDLP, 1 x UUP
2005: 2 x DUP, 1 x Alliance, 1 x SDLP, 1 x UUP
2001-2005 Change: No change

References

Castlereagh Borough Council elections
Castlereagh